is a Japanese voice actor. 

Born in Tokyo, he is affiliated with Seinenza Theater Company. His wife is a fellow voice actress .

Filmography

Anime

Tokusatsu

Overseas dubs

References

External links
 Official agency profile 
 
 
 "Hiroshi Yanaka" at Ryu's Seiyuu Info

1958 births
Living people
Male voice actors from Tokyo
Japanese male video game actors
Japanese male voice actors
20th-century Japanese male actors
21st-century Japanese male actors